The Close Combat Clasp was a World War II German military award instituted on 25 November 1942 for participation in hand-to-hand fighting at close quarters. Intended primarily for infantry, other Wehrmacht, Waffen-SS, ground Luftwaffe units and paratroopers were also eligible.

Eligibility
The award was bestowed in three classes:
Bronze for 15 close combat actions;
Silver for 25 close combat actions;
Gold for 50 close combat actions.
Close combat actions were counted from 1 December 1942, with earlier long service on the Eastern Front counting towards the award, with 15 continuous months counting as 15 combat days; 12 months as 10 days; and 8 months as 5 days. 

For those who had received disabling wounds, there was discretion to make the award after 10, 20 and 40 actions.

As the war continued, a number of amendments were made to the award criteria:
From 4 August 1944, only front-line actions could count towards the clasp, with rear actions against partisans reflected in the award of the Bandit-warfare Badge.
From 30 August 1944, recipients of the gold clasp were normally also awarded the German Cross in gold; with silver clasp recipients receiving the Iron Cross first class, both without the need for further justification.
From 8 October 1944, those awarded the gold clasp also received 21 days special leave. 

The Gold Close Combat Clasp was often regarded in higher esteem than the Knight's Cross of the Iron Cross by the German infantry, and Hitler reserved the right to bestow this class personally. Of the roughly 18–20 million soldiers of the German Wehrmacht and Waffen-SS, 36,400 received the Bronze Class, 9,500 the Silver Class and 631 the Gold Class.

Design and wear
The clasp was worn above the upper left uniform pocket, above any medal ribbon bar. Only one badge, the highest level received, was worn. It was die-cast and made of either tombac or later zinc. The design of all three classes was the same, with a centerpiece consisting of the eagle and swastika national emblem surmounting a crossed bayonet and hand grenade with, each side, a spray of oakleaves, interspersed with a sunburst ray effect. The clasp was slightly curved and measured 9.7cm by 2.6cm.

Nazi-era awards were initially banned by the post-war Federal Republic of Germany. In 1957 many World War II military decorations, including the Close Combat Clasp, were re-authorised for wear by qualifying veterans. As displays of the swastika were banned, the clasp was re-designed to remove the eagle and swastika symbol, with members of the Bundeswehr wearing the badge on the ribbon bar, represented by a small replica of the award on a field grey ribbon.

Luftwaffe version
Luftwaffe ground troops and paratroopers had been eligible for the Close Combat Clasp from its creation. In November 1944 a Luftwaffe version was approved, applying the same award criteria and three classes as the existing clasp. The badge comprised a laurel wreath set behind a Luftwaffe eagle and swastika surmounting a crossed bayonet and hand grenade, all in silver. This was flanked by two sprays of oak leaves, in bronze, silver or gold to denote the appropriate class. While awards of the new clasp were authorised, and award certificates issued, there is no evidence that it was actually manufactured and presented before the end of the war.

The Luftwaffe Close Combat Clasp was among the decorations re-authorised for wear by the Federal Republic of Germany in 1957, the modified design omitting the swastika, but retaining the Luftwaffe eagle emblem.

References

Sources

Awards established in 1942
Military awards and decorations of Nazi Germany
1942 establishments in Germany